Bulca or Bulcă may refer to
Bulca, Sinanpaşa, a village in Turkey 
Fuat Bulca (1881–1962), Turkish military officer and politician
Ioana Bulcă (born 1933), Romanian film actress